A woven or storiform pattern is a histopathologic architectural pattern. The name "storiform" originates from Latin storea (woven), as storiform tissue tends to resemble woven fabric on microscopy.

Storiform fibrosis is a histologic sign of IgG4-related disease, accompanied by a dense lymphoplasmocytic infiltrate, often a partially eosinophilic infiltrate and obliterative phlebitis.

See also
Histopathology, for additional patterns

References

Histopathology